RPN NewsCap is the flagship English late-evening news program of RPN. which was aired from November 30, 2009, to October 29, 2012, replacing NewsWatch: Second Edition. This serves as a spin-off RPN NewsWatch until it was axed in 2012 upon Solar Entertainment Corporation's purchase of RPN's majority stake.

Final anchors
 Isabel Roces (2011–2012)

Past anchors
 Queen Sebastian (2009–2011)

Past News Reporters
 April Abello
 Carlo Carongoy
 Janeena Chan
 Marlene Alcaide
 Dale De Vera
 Evangeline Evangelista
 Viviene Guilla
 Phoebe Javier
 Emman Paz
 Pircelyn Pialago
 Raissa Puno-Diaz
 Marsha Tañedo
 Dennis Principe
 Joyce Ilas
 Stephanie Ongkiko
 Ina Andolong
 Chester Lobramonte
 Jamela Alindogan
 Adrian Ayalin
 Jerald Uy
 Luisa Jimenez
 Bestie Konisis
 Peter Martin
 Maeanne Los Baños
 Grace Asuncion
 Paolo Capino
 Andrea Lagmay
 Jamie Santos

See also
 RPN NewsWatch
 RPN NewsWatch Update
 Solar Nightly News
 List of programs previously broadcast by Radio Philippines Network

2009 Philippine television series debuts
2012 Philippine television series endings
Philippine television news shows
English-language television shows
Radio Philippines Network news shows
RPN News and Public Affairs shows
Flagship evening news shows